Classic Fantastic is the sixth and most recent studio album by the Fun Lovin' Criminals, released in 2010.  Barring the Another Mimosa compilation, Classic Fantastic is frontman Huey Morgan's final studio album with the band, before his departure in 2021.

Track listing
 "Mars" - 3:00
 "Classic Fantastic" - 4:30
 "The Originals" - 2:38
 "She Sings At The Sun" - 3:35
 "Keep On Yellin'" (featuring Roots Manuva) - 3:12 
 "Jimi Choo" - 2:14
 "El Malo" - 4:10
 "Conversations With Our Attorney" (featuring Paul Kaye) - 1:24
 "We, The Three" - 2:56
 "How Low?" - 2:37
 "Mister Sun" - 4:02
 "Rewind" - 4:00
 "Get Your Coat" - 3:53
iTunes Bonus Track
 "Soul of a Man" - 3:33

References

2010 albums
Fun Lovin' Criminals albums